Tropical Storm Megi, known in the Philippines as Tropical Storm Agaton, was a weak but deadly tropical cyclone that impacted the Philippines in April 2022. It was the third tropical depression, and the second tropical storm of the 2022 Pacific typhoon season. Megi originated from an area of convection in the Philippine Sea where it slowly tracked northwestward into Leyte Gulf, where it remained almost stationary, slowly tracking to the east. Megi made two landfalls, one in Calicoan Island in Guiuan, and another in Basey, Samar. It continued to track southwestward and reentered the Philippine Sea before dissipating.

Heavy rains and gales led to the sinking of two ships. Major landslides pushed mud over villages in Leyte, burying around 210 houses. , the Philippines' National Disaster Risk Reduction and Management Council (NDRRMC) has reported 214 deaths, 132 missing, and 8 injured. The Department of Agriculture estimates worth ₱ in agricultural damages, and the Department of Public Works and Highways estimates worth ₱ in infrastructural damages, for a total of ₱ (US$). These currently differ from the damages reported by the NDRRMC, which remain at ₱ (US$).

Meteorological history

The Japan Meteorological Agency (JMA) began tracking the disturbance as a tropical depression later that day. Around the same time, the Philippine Atmospheric, Geophysical and Astronomical Services Administration (PAGASA) reported that the system had developed into a tropical depression, was named Agaton by the agency. The PAGASA began issuing Tropical Cyclone Bulletins (TCBs) for the storm later that day.

On April 9, the Joint Typhoon Warning Center (JTWC) later issued a Tropical Cyclone Formation Alert (TCFA) for the system. The system's broad low-level circulation center further consolidated and by 03:00 UTC, the agency upgraded it to a tropical depression and assigned it the designation 03W.

Prior to and in the early hours of April 10, the JMA, JTWC, and PAGASA upgraded the system to a tropical storm, with the JMA assigning the name Megi for the storm. Although the environment's conditions were generally favorable for development, the system only maintained its strength across the day as it began interacting with land.

Megi made its first landfall over Calicoan Island, Guiuan at 07:30 PHT on April 10 (23:30 UTC, April 9). Weak steering winds made the storm almost stationary over Leyte Gulf while maintaining its  winds near its center. The limited development prompted downgrades of the system to a tropical depression by the JTWC on 21:00 UTC, and by the PAGASA on 08:00 PHT (00:00 UTC) on April 11. After a few hours of slow, northwestward movement, the storm made its second landfall over Basey, Samar around 16:00 PHT (08:00 UTC). Shortly after, the JTWC issued its final warning for the storm.

Megi continued to slowly meander the LeyteSamar area, driven by conflicting trade winds and westerlies. As the storm further deteriorated under the influence of land, the JMA issued its final advisory for the storm at 06:00 UTC on April 12. The PAGASA also issued its final bulletin for the storm soon after as it further weakened into a low-pressure area. Megi continued to track southeastward and reentered the Philippine Sea around 18:00 UTC. The JMA continued to monitor the system until it was last noted at 06:00 UTC on April 13.

Preparations 

Upon Megi's developing into a tropical depression, the PAGASA immediately began issuing Signal No. 1 warnings over Eastern Samar, Siargao, and the Bucas Grande and Dinagat Islands. The agency also began raising Signal No. 2 warnings and expanded its bubble of areas under Signal No. 1 after it developed into a tropical storm. Classes and work in Danao, Cebu were suspended as early as April 10.

On April 11, classes in Cebu City, Lapu-Lapu City, Mandaue, Talisay, Carcar, and Tacloban were all suspended. Classes were also suspended in the entire province of Southern Leyte and in parts of Negros Occidental. Cebu City and Tacloban also suspended work in both government and private sectors, and began evacuating residents near rivers and shorelines. The Department of Foreign Affairs suspended operations for two of their consular offices in the affected areas. According to the NDRRMC, 33,443 people were preemptively evacuated.

PLDT and Globe Telecom, both Philippine telecommunications companies, prepared free calling and charging stations ahead of the storm. On April 12, the Department of Social Welfare and Development (DSWD) announced that it had prepared ₱ (US$) worth of family food packs, with an additional ₱ (US$) worth of non-food items.

Impact 

Most of Megi's damages were concentrated in the Visayas region, where the storm lingered for most of its lifespan. Persistent heavy rains, flash flooding, and strong winds led to widespread floods and landslides across the two regions. Some of the areas affected by Megi were recently hit by Typhoon Rai, and were only beginning to recover prior to Megi's impact.

On April 10, heavy waves tipped over a roll-on/roll-off vessel in San Francisco, Cebu, causing it to sink, and also capsized a cargo vessel in Ormoc. Travelers going home for Holy Week in Eastern and Central Visayas were stranded in ports due to the severe weather conditions. A total of around 8,769 passengers were stranded in the western regions of the Philippines. Power outages were reported in 76 cities and municipalities. The outages also affected services for telecommunications companies in the area. , floods still persist in at least 261 areas across Visayas and Mindanao.

The NDRRMC reported 2,298,780 affected people, 886,822 of which were displaced from their homes. The agency also reports a total 214 dead, 132 left missing, and 8 injured . In Baybay, the city reported a total of 101 deaths, 102 left missing, and 103 injured, with a landslide covering an entire barangay of 210 households in mud. In Pilar, Abuyog, 26 people were killed, 96 were injured, 150 were left missing, and 80 percent of houses were buried. The Ministry of Social Services and Development in the Bangsamoro reported at least 136,000 affected people in the Bangsamoro Special Geographic Area (geographically in Cotabato). On April 21, the NDRRMC incorrectly reported 224 deaths after some of the bodies found were duplicated in their latest report.

Agricultural damages are estimated by the NDRRMC at ₱, with infrastructural damages estimated at ₱. In addition, 16,382 houses were damaged (with 2,258 houses totally destroyed), causing an additional estimated ₱ in damages. In total, the NDRRMC estimates at least ₱ (US$) in damages due to Megi. The Department of Agriculture estimates a higher damage toll for the agricultural sector, reaching over ₱. The Department of Public Works and Highways also reports a higher damage to infrastructure; estimating around ₱, for a total of  ₱ (US$) in damages.

Aftermath 

Searches for survivors by local government units began by April 12 for areas hit by landslides, but was hampered by the severe weather and unstable ground. The Philippine Red Cross also begun search and rescue operations in the landslide-hit areas in Leyte. Survivors of landslides also began salvaging the remains of their houses. 61 areas declared a state of calamity, including the entire province of Davao de Oro.

The storm made its impact during the campaign period for the 2022 Philippine general election, wherein a resolution passed by the Commission on Elections (COMELEC) prohibited the release and expenditure of public funds for any government body or public official, limiting relief operations and the aid that could be immediately provided without the need for an appeal. In a televised interview, COMELEC commissioner George Garcia said that petitions from areas hit by Megi will be expedited. The Office of the Vice President under presidential candidate Leni Robredo, which was exempt from the prohibition, began coordinating with local government units and sent aid for affected communities on April 11. Distribution of relief packs were also facilitated through the DSWD, which was also exempt from the prohibition, instead of the local government units. The municipality of Guiuan announced the intent to file an appeal to the COMELEC. Additionally, presidential candidates Bongbong Marcos and Manny Pacquiao also stated the intent to file petitions for exemption in order to provide aid for affected areas. Despite the damages, the COMELEC assured that the election on May 9 will proceed as planned, with makeshift voting centers to be made in affected areas.

Private individuals and organizations also began donation drives for the affected areas. Volunteer organizations began relief operations, with some donation drives posted on social media under various hashtags. Reservists were also deployed to assist with aid distribution and preparation and with search and retrieval efforts.

President Rodrigo Duterte and Senator Bong Go visited Leyte and Capiz on April 15, where they performed aerial inspections of the landslide-hit areas and participated in the distribution of relief goods. Duterte and Go also visited the Western Leyte Provincial Hospital to meet those injured by the storm. In a press briefing held in Baybay, Duterte promised housing for victims after they have resettled, but mentioned that it would be a “a long, long process and not an easy one unless there’s a miracle.”

The Department of Energy (DOE) announced a 15-day price freeze for liquefied petroleum gas and kerosene products in areas under a state of calamity on April 14, but specifically allowed price rollbacks. The DOE later expanded the price freeze on April 21 to cover more areas. , the NDRRMC reports that assistance and relief goods worth ₱ (US$) have been distributed to affected families.

Chinese Ambassador to the Philippines Huang Xilian announced that China had donated US$200,000 towards relief operations. Pope Francis and South Korean President Moon Jae-in also expressed their solidarity and condolences to the affected.

See also

Weather of 2022
Tropical cyclones in 2022
Tropical Storm Rumbia (Toyang, 2000) – a weak tropical storm which generally affected the same areas in late-2000
Tropical Depression Winnie (2004) – a short-lived tropical cyclone which caused landslides that killed nearly 1,600 people in November 2004
Tropical Storm Lingling (Agaton, 2014) – a deadly early-season tropical storm also named Agaton by PAGASA; brought heavy rainfall to the eastern part of the Philippines
Tropical Storm Jangmi (Seniang, 2014) – a weak tropical cyclone that impacted the Philippines in December 2014
Tropical Storm Kai-tak (Urduja, 2017) – another late-season tropical cyclone that affected Visayas in December 2017
Typhoon Phanfone (Ursula, 2019) – a strong typhoon in December 2019 that also impacted the same areas
Typhoon Rai (Odette, 2021) – a violent typhoon that devastated the same areas 4 months earlier

References

External links

JMA General Information of Tropical Storm Megi (2202) from Digital Typhoon
JMA Best Track Data (Graphics) of Tropical Storm Megi (2202)
JTWC Best Track Data of Tropical Storm 03W (Megi)
03W.MEGI from the U.S. Naval Research Laboratory

2022 disasters in the Philippines
2022 meteorology
2022 Pacific typhoon season
April 2022 events in the Philippines
Landslides in the Philippines
Tropical cyclones in 2022
Typhoons in the Philippines
Western Pacific tropical storms